Freddy Votel is an American drummer and best known as a member of the noise rock group Cows and as a founding member of T.V.B.C.

Biography
Freddy Votel grew up in Saint Paul before moving to Minneapolis and becoming involved in the music scene there. He began performing with guitarist and vocalist Paul Metzger in 1983. Together with Pat Dzieweczynski they formed the post-punk band T.V.B.C. in 1985. The trio recorded two albums for Treehouse Records, the first Ex Cathedra in 1987 and the second titled The Blues the following year. The group disbanded in 1993. In 1995 Votel joined the group Cows, who had already recorded and released numerous albums. He recorded Whorn and Sorry in Pig Minor with them before the band dissolved in 1998.

Votel returned to T.V.B.C. when they recorded Man With a Movie Camera in 2003, a live performance of soundtrack to accompany a screening of Dziga Vertov's 1929 silent film of the same name. The band reunited again in 2011 to perform live at The Loring in Minneapolis.

Musical style
Votel favors playing that is emotionally driven as opposed to technically proficient, naming drummers Stewart Copeland, John Bonham, Max Roach, Elvin Jones and Keith Moon as particularly influential to him. Favorite musical artists include: Steroid Maximus, Captain Beefheart, Miles Davis, Sparks, Skeleton Key, AC/DC, Snakefinger, Wire, Ornette Coleman, Can, Kraftwerk, Swans and Sielun Veljet.

Discography

References

External links

Living people
1965 births
Musicians from Minneapolis
American rock drummers
American punk rock drummers
American male drummers
Post-hardcore musicians
Noise rock musicians
Cows (band) members
20th-century American drummers
20th-century American male musicians